Hartinger is a surname. Notable people with the surname include:

Anton Hartinger (1806–1890), Austrian painter
Brent Hartinger, American writer
Christian Hartinger, Austrian-born New Zealand chemist
James V. Hartinger (1925–2000), United States Air Force general
John M. Hartinger (born 1955), American politician
Josef Hartinger (1893–1984), German lawyer
Vladimir Hartinger (born 1979), Czech ice hockey player